Santa Vitória (holy victory) may refer to:

 Santa Vitória do Palmar, a Brazilian municipality in state Rio Grande do Sul
 Santa Vitória, Minas Gerais, a Brazilian municipality in the state of Minas Gerais

See also
 Vitória (disambiguation)